{{DISPLAYTITLE:Omicron1 Centauri}}

Omicron1 Centauri (ο1 Cen, ο1 Centauri) is a star in the constellation Centaurus.  It is approximately 10,000 light years from Earth.

ο1 Centauri is a yellow G-type supergiant or hypergiant with a mean apparent magnitude of +5.13.  It is classified as a semiregular variable star and its brightness varies from magnitude +5.8 to +6.6 with a period of 200 days.  Other studies have reported only small brightness variations.  It is the MK spectral standard for class G3 O-Ia, indicating a highly luminous mass-losing hypergiant star.  It has also be classified as F8 Ia0 and F7 Ia/ab.  The size, luminosity, and distance are equally uncertain.

ο1 Cen forms a very close naked eye double star with ο2 Centauri, a hotter supergiant that may be physically associated.  ο1 Cen also has an 11th magnitude companion only 13.5" distant, Although it appears to be a foreground star unrelated to the other two.

References 

Centauri, Omicron1
Centaurus (constellation)
Semiregular variable stars
G-type hypergiants
4441
056243
100261
Durchmusterung objects